Felipe Wang-Xi Lee-Chong Cartes (born 21 October 1997) is a Chilean footballer who plays as a right-back for Trasandino.

Club career
Lee-Chong made his professional debut in 2016 for Puerto Montt, playing 90 minutes in a 1–1 Primera B de Chile draw with Deportes La Serena. Despite this appearance, he left Puerto Montt at the end of the season, before joining Tercera A side Rodelindo Román. He joined Trasandino in 2020, but due to the COVID-19 pandemic in Chile, he was unable to play the full season, and resorted to selling hamburgers with his cousin to make a living.

He returned to professional football in 2021, signing with Segunda División side Deportes Recoleta. Despite helping the club to promotion, he was released at the end of the season, returning to Trasandino, who were now in the Segunda División. He renewed his contract with Trasandino for the 2023 season.

Personal life
Lee-Chong's grandfather, Chong Lee Lam (known in Chile as Benito Lee Chong Lam), fled his native China to avoid the rising tensions between China and Japan, as well as the Chinese Civil War, arriving in Chile in 1928. He went on to run a butchers shop in Santiago, and had six children, including Óscar and Luis, both of whom went on to play football.

Felipe is the son of Óscar Lee-Chong, and the nephew of Luis. His cousin, Jaime Carreño, is also a professional footballer. In 2019, he spent time on trial with then-Chinese Super League side Jiangsu Suning, and unsuccessfully attempted to gain Chinese nationality.

He has a son, also named Óscar, who was born in 2018.

Career statistics

Club

Notes

References

1997 births
Living people
Chilean people of Chinese descent
Chilean footballers
Association football fullbacks
Primera B de Chile players
Segunda División Profesional de Chile players
Deportes Puerto Montt footballers
Rodelindo Román footballers
Deportes Recoleta footballers